Tioxolone (INN, also spelled thioxolone) is an anti-acne preparation.

References

Anti-acne preparations
Benzoxathioles
Phenols